Alibaba Balaahmed oğlu Mammadov (5 February 1929 – 25 February 2022) was an Azerbaijani singer and composer of mugham music.

Biography
Mammadov was born in Maştağa, in a musical environment. He attended the Azerbaijani State Music School and attended the classes of Seyid Shushinski. In 1945, he joined the Azerbaijan State Academic Philharmonic Hall.

From 1978 to 1988, he was part of the "Azkonsert birliyi", which previously included artists such as Bulbul, Khan Shushinski, Shovkat Alakbarova, Sara Gadimova, Haji Mammadov, and others. He became director of the "Humayun" Folk Instrumental Ensemble at the Azerbaijan State Academic Philharmonic Hall.

Several of Mammadov's songs are kept in the AzTV archive. He became a mugham professor at the Baku Musical College in 1963, training prominent Azerbaijani singers and paving the way for the modern-day art of mugham.

Mammadov died in Baku on 25 February 2022, at the age of 93.

References

External Links
 
 

1929 births
2022 deaths
Azerbaijani singers
Azerbaijani composers
Azerbaijani artists
Mugham singers
Recipients of the Istiglal Order
Recipients of the Sharaf Order
Recipients of the Shohrat Order
People from Baku Governorate
Burials at Alley of Honor